Jules Eugene Pages (1867-1946), sometimes Jules Eugène Pagès, was an American painter. He is known for landscape, marine and genre paintings in the impressionist manner.

Biography 
Born in San Francisco, California on May 16, 1867, to parents with French ancestry. He was raised in an artistic environment. His father, Jules Françios Pages (1843-1910) ran a local engraving business, and his son worked there as an apprentice. In 1888, he moved to Paris, France in order to study at the Académie Julian under Jules Joseph Lefebvre, Jean-Joseph Benjamin-Constant and Tony Robert-Fleury.

After returning to San Francisco, he worked as an illustrator for The San Francisco Examiner, and other newspapers. He returned to Paris, in 1902 and began teaching night classes at the Académie Julian. Pages spent forty years in France, returning frequently to San Francisco to paint and exhibit his work. He exhibited his work in 1915 at the Panama-Pacific International Exposition (PPIE).

Following the outbreak of World War II, Pages returned to the United States and died in San Francisco on May 22, 1946.

Collections 
 San Francisco's De Young (museum)
 Musée d'Orsay
 Bohemian Club of San Francisco

Gallery

Bibliography 
Bohemian Club, 1946 :Jules Pages took his leave the other day ...

References

External links 
 California Art Company Jules Pages
 Jules Eugène Pages on Artnet

1867 births
1946 deaths
Académie Julian alumni
Academic staff of the Académie Julian
Artists from California
20th-century American painters